The  was developed for aerial use for the Imperial Japanese Navy in 1932. The Type 92 is a light machine gun and not to be confused with the similarly named Type 92 heavy machine gun.

Description
It was the standard hand-held machine gun in multi-place IJN aircraft during the most part of the Pacific War. It proved to be seriously inadequate. Aircraft produced in the later part of the conflict often were equipped with weapons such as Type 1 and Type 2 machine guns or Type 99 cannon.

Essentially a copy of the shroudless post-World War I aircraft-mounted version of the British Lewis gun, the Type 92 was fed with a 97-round drum magazine and used on a flexible mount. It was chambered in a Japanese copy of the .303 British cartridge. The main external difference between the two models was the trigger guard, and cooling fins around the barrel and gas piston tube. Neither the post-World War I British aircraft Lewis nor the Japanese copy featured the distinctive thick barrel shroud of the original gun (although ground-based versions generally retained it). It was removed as it was found that the airflow past the aircraft was sufficient for cooling the barrel and eliminating the shroud reduced the mass.

Installations
 Aichi D1A
 Aichi D3A
 Kawanishi E7K2
 Kawanishi H6K
 Kawanishi H8K
 Kyūshū Q1W
 Mitsubishi F1M2
 Mitsubishi G3M
 Mitsubishi G4M
 Nakajima B5N
 Nakajima B6N
 Yokosuka B4Y
 Yokosuka K5Y
 Various others

See also
 Type 89 machine gun (the Imperial Japanese Army equivalent to the Type 92))
 MG 15 machine gun
 MG 81 machine gun
 Vickers VGO

Notes

References

 
 McNab, Chris. Twentieth-century Small Arms 

Aircraft guns
Machine guns of Japan
World War II machine guns
Military equipment introduced in the 1930s